Sheikhupura–Hafizabad Road (Punjabi), also known locally as Jandiala Road is a provincially maintained road in Punjab that extends from Sheikhupura to Hafizabad.

Features
Length - 50 km
Lanes - 4 lane
Speed limit - Universal minimum speed limit of 60 km/h and a maximum speed limit of 80 km/h for heavy transport vehicles and 100 km/h for light transport vehicles.

References

Roads in Punjab, Pakistan
Sheikhupura District